American Political Thought is a quarterly peer-reviewed academic journal focusing on American "ideas, institutions, and culture." It is published by the University of Chicago Press and sponsored by the American Political Thought organized section of the American Political Science Association.  The journal bridges "the gap between historical, empirical, and theoretical research." It was established in 2012, and is "the only peer-reviewed academic journal exclusively devoted to its subject." The founding editor-in-chief was Michael Zuckert (University of Notre Dame). The current editors are Jeremy Bailey (University of Houston) and Susan McWilliams (Pomona College).

Abstracting and indexing 
The journal is abstracted and indexed in the Emerging Sources Citation Index, EBSCO databases, and Scopus.

References

External links 
 
 American Political Thought Section of the American Political Science Association

Political science journals
Publications established in 2012